"Girlfriend" is a song by American singer Pebbles from her 1987 self-titled debut studio album. Written and produced by L.A. Reid and Babyface, "Girlfriend" was released as the album's lead single on October 26, 1987, by record label MCA. The song charted in several countries, peaking at number five on the US Billboard Hot 100 and reaching the top 10 in Ireland and the United Kingdom.

Background
The song was originally intended for Vanessa Williams' debut album The Right Stuff. According to L.A. Reid, Williams' record label Wing showed interest in Williams' recording "Girlfriend", which Reid played for her alone in his apartment. However, Pebbles heard the song and offered Reid more money and two cars for the chance to record it. As a result, the production team were not asked to work on more songs on Williams' debut. Reid said due to that incident, Williams never spoke to him again.

Chart performance
"Girlfriend" became Pebbles' first top-five hit on the US Billboard Hot 100 chart and her first number one song on the Hot R&B/Hip-Hop Songs chart. In the United Kingdom, the single peaked at number eight, becoming Pebbles' only top-10 hit there.

Awards and accolades
"Girlfriend" earned Pebbles her first nomination for the Best Female R&B Vocal Performance at the 1989 Grammy Awards, losing to "Giving You the Best That I Got" by Anita Baker.

Track listings

7-inch and Japanese mini-CD single
 "Girlfriend" – 4:19
 "Girlfriend" (instrumental) – 4:19

US, European, and Australian 12-inch single
A1. "Girlfriend" (extended version) – 6:49
B1. "Girlfriend" (instrumental) – 6:49
B2. "Girlfriend" (dub version) – 4:54

UK 12-inch single
A1. "Girlfriend" (extended version) – 6:49
B1. "Girlfriend" (extended instrumental) – 6:49
B2. "Girlfriend" (vocal edit) – 5:45

UK 12-inch remix single
A1. "Girlfriend" (dance remix) – 8:30
B1. "Girlfriend" (extended instrumental) – 6:49
B2. "Girlfriend" (7-inch edit) – 3:45

UK CD single
 "Girlfriend" (7-inch version) – 3:43
 "Love/Hate" (radio edit) – 5:24
 "Girlfriend" (dance remix) – 8:27

Charts

Weekly charts

Year-end charts

Release history

Covers

Caramel version

UK garage duo Caramel released their version as a single in 1999, featuring Paule van Wijngaarden on vocals. It reached No. 9 on the UK Dance Singles Chart.

Track listing
UK CD single
 "Girlfriend" (Radio Mix) - 4:06
 "Voodoo Man" (Radio Mix) - 3:35
 "Girlfriend" (Master Mix) - 6:57

Charts

Other versions
 British band the Beautiful South also covered the song for their 1989 debut album Welcome to the Beautiful South.
 Japanese singer Takako Ohta released her version from the 1989 album Thanks, sung in Japanese and English.
 Girl group Rísquée recorded a version for their only album Risquing It All in 1999.
 British singer Sinitta covered the song in 2016.

See also
 List of number-one R&B singles of 1988 (U.S.)

References

1987 songs
1987 singles
1999 singles
MCA Records singles
Perri "Pebbles" Reid songs
Song recordings produced by Babyface (musician)
Song recordings produced by L.A. Reid
Songs written by Babyface (musician)
Songs written by L.A. Reid